Year's Best SF 15 is a science fiction anthology edited by David G. Hartwell and Kathryn Cramer that was published in June 2010.  It is the fifteenth in the Year's Best SF series.

Contents

The book itself, as well as each of the stories, has a short introduction by the editors.

 Vandana Singh: "Infinities" (Originally in The Woman Who Thought She Was a Planet and Other Stories, 2008)
 Robert Charles Wilson: "This Peaceable Land; or, The Unbearable Vision of Harriet Beecher Stowe" (Originally in Other Rifts, 2009)
 Yoon Ha Lee: "The Unstrung Zither" (Originally in F&SF, 2009)
 Bruce Sterling: "Black Swan" (Originally in Interzone, 2009)
 Nancy Kress: "Exegesis" (Originally in Asimov's, 2009)
 Ian Creasey: "Erosion" (Originally in Asimov's, 2009)
 Gwyneth Jones: "Collision" (Originally in When It Changed, 2009)
 Gene Wolfe: "Donovan Sent Us" (Originally published online by Other Earths, 2009)
 Marissa K. Lingen: "The Calculus Plague" (Originally in Analog, 2009)
 Peter Watts: "The Island" (Originally in The New Space Opera 2, 2009)
 Paul Cornell: "One of Our Bastards Is Missing" (Originally in The Solaris Book of New Science Fiction: Volume Three, 2009)
 Sarah L. Edwards: "Lady of the White-Spired City" (Originally in Interzone, 2009)
 Brian Stableford: "The Highway Code" (Originally in We Think, Therefore We Are, 2009)
 Peter M. Ball: "On the Destruction of Copenhagen by the War-Machines of the Merfolk" (Originally in Strange Horizons, 2009)
 Alastair Reynolds: "The Fixation" (Originally in The Solaris Book of New Science Fiction: Volume Three, 2009)
 Brenda Cooper: "In Their Garden" (Originally in Asimov's, 2009)
 Geoff Ryman: "Blocked" (Originally in F&SF, 2009)
 Michael Cassutt: "The Last Apostle" (Originally in Asimov's, 2009)
 Charles Oberndorf: "Another Life" (Originally in F&SF, 2009)
 Mary Robinette Kowal: "The Consciousness Problem" (Originally in Asimov's, 2009)
 Stephen Baxter: "Tempest 43" (Originally in We Think, Therefore We Are, 2009)
 Genevieve Valentine: "Bespoke" (Originally in Strange Horizons, 2009)
 Eric James Stone: "Attitude Adjustment" (Originally in Analog, 2009)
 Chris Roberson: "Edison's Frankenstein" (Originally in Edison's Frankenstein, 2009)

External links

2010 anthologies
2010s science fiction works
Year's Best SF anthology series
Eos Books books